Gorg Abi Mirza Ali (also Romanized as Gorg Ābī Mīrzā ʿAlī; also known as Gorg Ābī) is a village in Hasanabad Rural District, in the Central District of Ravansar County, Kermanshah Province, Iran. At the 2006 census, its population was 137, in 32 families.

References 

Populated places in Ravansar County